Billy Gram (born February 16, 1970) is an American musician, screenwriter, actor, professional wrestler manager, color commentator and political activist. He is best known for appearances with the Philly punk-metal band Saints in Hell and his solo project Ghostdance Tribe. He has also appeared for the professional wrestling promotions Combat Zone Wrestling and IWA Mid South as the manager of Cult Fiction.

Music and acting career
From 1980 through 1982 Gram was a founding member and the singer/frontman for Philly punk-metal band Saints in Hell, whose lineup also included future Cinderella members Tom Keifer and Eric Brittingham.

In 1986 Gram was involved as an actor and animal wrangler on the film Street Trash.

1991 saw the release of the indy CD/album Ghostdance Tribe, with singer/guitarist Gram as the writer of all the material, and performances by Tom Keifer, Ronnie Younkins of The Kix, Bill Mattson of Tangier, all the members of Britny Fox, Kevin Moore of Dandelion and Johnny Dee of Doro.

For two weeks, in November 1999, Gram's Traditional Native Drum Group, The Sovereign Nation Singers were performing as part of a demonstration/event in front of The White House. Billy spent the final four days of that protest, in a ceremony, fasting inside a large teepee that had been set up on the ellipse adjacent to the White House.

In 2005 Gram directed a documentary on the career of pro wrestler Ox Baker. The film has yet to be released.

In 2006 Billy appeared as a zombie in the film Shadow: Dead Riot. Billy also appeared that year in The Meltdown Memoirs, a documentary celebrating the 20th Anniversary of Street Trash.

In 2009 Billy was cast in director Fred Vogel's Anthology film The Murder Collection as a college professor of Native American studies. Due to a technical difficulty with a special effect and the fact that if any reshoots were attempted they then would not have enough time to do an acceptable cut of the film and still have enough time to fulfill a contracted release date, so sadly the entire segment was cut from the film. No word from ToeTag Pictures on an impending future release.

In 2010 Gram was cast as a cross-dressing, necrophiliac grave digger in director Anthony Matthews' Revenge is Her Middle Name. The film, with Billy's scenes intact was released in 2012. Two of Gram's old Ghostdance Tribe songs, "Pain Makes the World Go 'Round" and "Electric Lovepump Blues" are included as part of the soundtrack. Also in 2010, Billy was cast as The Demon/Indian in The Cemetery by director Adam Ahlbrandt and The Dungeon Master in director Tom Savini's Wet Dreams segment for the anthology film The Theatre Bizarre.  The Theater Bizarre debuted at The Fantasia Film Festival in July 2011. The Cemetery was released in 2013. Gram was featured in the film's poster/cover painting.

In 2019 the projects Gram filmed with Ox Baker are set for release, around mid-year. Two separate films, a documentary I LOVE THE PEOPLE I HURT: The Life and Legend of the Mighty Ox Baker, and a short comedy feature (approximately 55 minutes) MY SMORGASBOARD WITH OX. The latter is co-starring and co-written by Gram and Baker.

Professional wrestling career

Early career
Billy's initial training in professional wrestling took place at The Monster Factory in 1992. Gram worked sporadic indy shows from 1993 through 1995 and then quit the business.

In 2003, after befriending Toby Klein and Deranged, Gram re-entered the world of pro wrestling, working small independent shows as Klein's manager.

In 2003 Gram created the concept of his stable Cult Fiction. The initial concept, an Ultra-Violent Four Horseman meet the Manson Family. The original group was conceived as Gram, along with Klein, Deranged, Brain Damage and The Necro Butcher.

Combat Zone Wrestling (2007–2010)

In 2007, Halfbreed Billy Gram debuted in both Combat Zone Wrestling (CZW) and IWA Mid South, as the leader and manager of the faction known as Cult Fiction, whose members in the ensuing years have included "Mister Insanity" Toby Klein, Necro Butcher, Brain Damage, Deranged, Ox Baker, Masada, J. C. Bailey, Tank, Tracy Smothers, Freakshow, Matt Tremont, J.D. Horror and Sage Sin

Late in 2007, Billy also began working as a color commentator for CZW. Gram's two wrestling charges in 2007 Toby Klein and Necro Butcher spent 2007 feuding with members of the Maven Bentley Association. The final event of CZW's calendar year Cage of Death 9 found Gram in the corner of Team CZW: Toby Klein, The Necro Butcher, Drake Younger and Danny Havoc as they took on Team MBA: D. J. Hyde, Brain Damage, Scotty Vortekz and Dustin Lee in the main event. At the end of 2007, the fans on CZW's official forums voted for their annual year end awards, and Gram was the winner of the award for "Best Mic Work".

In addition, throughout the course of 2008 Cult Fiction became even more visible in CZW. Gram was the color commentator for CZW throughout most of the year. His Cult Fiction stable was relaunched in CZW, first with the addition of Brain Damage, and later Deranged. At Cage of Death 10, in the course of the semi-main event, a fans-bring-the-weapons match that saw Gram's charge Deranged against Gram's perennial nemesis D. J. Hyde, at some point during the course of mayhem and the ebb and flow of the Ultra-Violence, Hyde assaulted Gram with an electric staple gun to the body and face. The match was a brutal contest(even by CZW standards) with all three men involved, Hyde, Deranged and even Gram bleeding profusely, all three took various amounts of very rough punishment and assault, the end would come with DERANGED taking the win for CULT FICTION, after he pinned Hyde for a three count, after Deranged was declared the winner and Gram snuck in a bit of post match punishment on Hyde who was still lying on his back in the ring, LOBO would come to the ring, take a few weapons and added more insult and injury to Hyde, berating him on the microphone and then firing him from CZW, significant because it was a dramatic device that would set up the most integral storyline of the following year, D. J. would not be seen in CZW again until six months after he had been fired, at which point the fans were shocked quite thoroughly when Hyde returned and John Zandig announced that he had sold CZW to the hated D. J. This was acted out in a dramatic and scripted bit in front of the entire arena, but nonetheless, the sale was real and Hyde in fact did buy the promotion from its founder.   Jumping back where we were, to Cage of Death 10, after the firing of D. J., there was a forty-minute intermission as the ring crew set up the actual Cage of Death. Once the setup was completed the Main Event, which saw six entrants all facing one another would commence. After the Semi Main Event and everything that had occurred, despite being beaten and injured Gram would also be in the corner of Brain Damage for the Main Event, making this the second year in a row Billy had been involved in the Main Event at Cage of Death.

Once again the fans on the aforementioned annual year end awards recognized Billy as he was again the winner of the award for "Best Mic Work", and for the first time "Best Manager", "Best Commentator" and the newly instituted "Mother F'n Bomb" award.

2009 saw Gram and his Cult Fiction team of Brain Damage and Deranged feuding with longtime CZW mainstays the H8 Club consisting of Nick Gage, Nate Hatred and their manager Dewey Donovan. CZW Tournament of Death 8 saw Gram in the corners of three CULT FICTION entrants, Brain Damage, Deranged and the returning Mister Insanity- Toby Klein with Gram delivering a mad display of fire breathing in the match between Deranged and Nick Gage. The end of the year saw Cult Fiction absent, with Gram alone confronting the new owner of Combat Zone Wrestling D. J. Hyde on several occasions demanding Cult Fiction's return. In December at Cage of Death 11, Gram was involved in another exciting, memorable CZW moment, that will most certainly be being revisited for decade after decade in the future by CZW fans and other wrestling fans who will surely recognize this segment as significant, exciting and legendary. The show had begun with an insane opening bout, a no-ropes barbwire match contesting the CZW ULTRAVIOLENT UNDERGROUND CHAMPIONSHIP between the Champion, GERMANY's Thumbtack Jack and CZW's most prolific Original and mainstay. "The Man" Nick F'N Gage! The match was a brutal, intense war, both men beat each other horribly, both were covered in their own blood, both kept the pace quicker and more offense packed than can be explained, it must be seen, both were lacerated by the barbwire, both took insane punishment and refused to fold to the brutal assault of their opponent. The match lasted close to an hour to the amazement of the sold-out crowd at the infamous bingo hall, one of wrestling's most infamous and legendary venues, The Arena at Ritner and Swanson in South Philly, the fans were fully vested in the match, loud, energetic, as into a match as crowd can be and by the time that moment came after such a long match, that TJ was able to pin Gage and get the three count and retain the Championship, the crowd seemed as exhausted as the two grapplers, they were drained as if they had fought the match because of how invested they were, Jack was struggling to stay standing, it took all he had and he barely succeeded in lifting the belt in just one hand raised above his head, gage was bent over, barely standing and being helped from the ring by his manager Dewey Donovan, as that point there were some odd noises, fresh ones in the mix of the crowd, again then louder and then obvious there is something wrong amongst the fans and rows of chairs on the east side, then it begins visible, TJ has his back to that side, oblivious to anything amiss, but Dewey sees them!! His eyes widen and he shouts more emphatically at Nicky and looks panicked, "Nicky come on!! Let's get out of here!!"  two men, there faces hidden and obscured by the hoods on their black sweat shirts are physically plowing right through the seats and fans toward the ring, the two men are tossing fans from their seats, pushing anyone who stands in front of them, aggressively and angrily clearing their own path through humans, Dewey just manages to get gage away from what's about to happen, the two hooded men quickly jump the rail and slide into the ring under the deadly barbwire, behind Thumbtack Jack who never sees it coming, as the taller of the two thugs screams and physically points desperate instructions, the other man, quite expertly shoves TJ from behind into the barbwire on the opposite side of the ring, the taller man is still shouting and both men quickly rip off their sweatshirts, half the crowd gasps in unison, losing their breath, stunned as the other half starts screaming, the two men are JC BAILEY and BILLY GRAM and both are wearing Cult Fiction T-shirts under their hoodies, no one had a clue that either man was even in the city, JC had been incarcerated in Kentucky for two years and Gram had apologized that he would not be at the event and then many of them saw promotional posters for a signing show in New York the same night and they listed and advertised Gram as one of the guests!  This all happened so fast that it almost seemed to be slow motion because no one was missing anything,  nothing else needed to be verbalized upon the crowd processing those well known shirts, who actually was wearing them and what it meant. As the hoodies were coming off Gram was pointing at TJ in the barbwire helpless, clearly spent and barely conscious, JC follows Gram's instructions and grabs TJ from the barbwire, Gram is screaming and pointing, there are cinder blocks in the center of the ring, Gram is going nuts and still giving orders and JC raises TJ upside down, feet above his head and gives TJ a wicked Brain Buster onto the cinder blocks!!!  JC Bailey and Gram look almost gleeful as they embrace and pat each other's backs, both make some very short statements at the fans, they are making it all very clear, they taunt and laugh and casually stroll from the scene laughing and smiling. Cult Fiction have plans and they have started a War that will dominate the main storyline and feud of CZW for the following thirteen months, bits and pieces unfolding on every CZW show regardless of where in the world it occurs. The first bullet was this post match attack on European Death Match sensation Thumbtack Jack and to fulfill a two pronged shock and awe style tactic, Gram then revealed that JC Bailey was the newest member of his Cult Fiction stable.  All the seeds were sown and for the first time in some years the fans were suddenly excited about what was ahead and couldn't wait for xmas to be over and were beyond excited for January's show, excited.

To close 2009, Gram and his Cult Fiction group were once again heavily acknowledged by fan votes in CZW's Annual Year  end Awards. For the third consecutive year Gram captured the Award for "Best Mic Work", and for the second consecutive year "Best Manager" (by a landslide with 71.79% of the vote) and "Best Commentator" (also a landslide with 72.22% of the vote, despite the fact that Billy had only been in the commentary position for half of TOD 8 and one other match the entire year). "Tag Team of the Year" was awarded to Cult Fiction (48.84% of the vote) and the "Feud of the Year" Award went to H8 Club vs. Cult Fiction (55.56% of the vote). "Return of the Year" award went to Cult Fiction member JC Bailey. "Video of the Year" award also went to Cult Fiction for Welcome to My Nightmare in a category that saw all five nominations consist of Cult Fiction music videos.

2010 saw yet another, larger more dominant Cult Fiction emerge as Billy and Bailey were joined first by former N.J. All-Star Lucky, who was "beaten into" the faction by Bailey and Gram and christened with a new name, . These three were then joined by the returning Brain Damage and subsequently, International Death Match Superstar Masada. This version of Cult Fiction were immediately embroiled in a feud with Fan favorites Danny Havoc, Drake Younger, Scotty Vortekz and Eddie Kingston who were newly dubbed The Suicide Kings. Necro Butcher and John Zandig also sided with the Suicide Kings at various points throughout the feud.

In June 2010, Gram and Cult Fiction were a huge presence at CZW Tournament of Death. Both JC Bailey and Masada with Billy in their corners were entrants in the tournament, and Brain Damage participated in a non-tournament grudge match against Drake Younger. An interesting storyline spilled from this event as in a post show interview, Gram, distraught over having been assaulted by Scotty Vortekz in his match against MASADA "quit" CZW. Many fans and co-workers believed Gram had seriously left the company. Gram made a shocking return in mid-August.

Gram and his Cult Fiction stable continued their feud with The Suicide Kings for the remainder of the year. Eventually Drake Younger turned heel and became an ally to Cult Fiction. The Suicide Kings two remaining original members were joined by Devon Moore and Dysfunction. The feud would culminate at Cage of Death XII in December 2010, with this Kings lineup facing Cult Fiction (Brain Damage, MASADA and ) and the newly monikered "Golden Boy" Drake Younger with Gram in their corner. After all the participants, save the winner Devon Moore had been eliminated, Gram found himself in the unenviable position of being alone with Moore atop the Cage of Death. Moore threw Gram from the top of the structure. The result for Gram was five broken bones in his right foot and leg. This had been four consecutive years Billy had been on the Cage of Death show, three of the four as a manager in the actual Cage of Death match itself.

Independent Wrestling Association: Mid-South
In 2008, Gram appeared frequently in Independent Wrestling Association: Mid-South leading the Cult Fiction stable. Managing Toby Klein, Brain Damage and Deranged. Later in the midst of a feud between Cult Fiction and Corporal Robinson, Tank would also become a member of the group. In October of that year Gram led his duo of Brain Damage and Deranged to victory in IWA MS's Double Death Tag Team Tournament, as they defeated the teams of Necro Butcher and Toby Klein (who had temporarily defected from Cult Fiction), Corporal Robinson and Tracy Smothers (Smothers turned on his partner and joined Cult Fiction), Danny Havoc and Dysfunction, and in the finals Drake Younger and Devon Moore. This gave Brain Damage and Deranged the distinction of being the only wrestlers to ever win any major independent wrestling tournament twice in consecutive years.

Independent Wrestling Association: Deep South
In 2011, Billy played a pivotal role in IWA Deep South's annual Carnage Cup, where two more wrestlers Freakshow and Matt Tremont joined Cult Fiction.

Underground Empire Wrestling
On July 11, 2015, Billy Gram made an unannounced appearance at Underground Empire Wrestling's Pledge Your Allegiance event (UEW is an independent promotion out of Los Angeles California), to announce JD Horror as the newest member of the Cult Fiction stable. Gram also managed the tag team of JD Horror and Homeless Jimmy in a bloody Tag Team Underground Rules Cagematch against BC Killer and The Insaniac.  During his time in the Underground both Homeless Jimmy and Sage Sin would also join Gram's Cult Fiction stable. Sage was the only female member in the group's storied history. Gram not only appeared in front of the cameras as a manager and performer but also was a writer and on the booking for the promotion for six months. He directed and wrote promos for much of the roster during his tenure. He has since left the promotion. As is often the case it seems Gram did not part on good terms with the company.

Feud with Ian Rotten
In 2008, sometime around the end of the year, Gram become involved in a public feud with IWA-MS owner Ian Rotten. Billy made allegations that Rotten had physically threatened himself as well as members of the Cult Fiction faction that he leads. Gram publicly vowed that Cult Fiction would never again appear in IWA MS. Billy then went on a public bashing of Rotten, lampooning him on wrestling websites and message boards.

In early 2011, Billy finally confronted his nemesis Ian Rotten person to person on an internet wrestling show called And Then The Bell Rang hosted by Jerry Wiseman. Gram exploded on Rotten. Joe Bailey the father of JC Bailey, Bull Pain, Mickie Knuckles and Madman Pondo also confronted Rotten on the show. Shortly after this, Rotten announced that he was closing the doors of his promotion IWA Mid-South. They remained closed for almost two years.

Writer
In 2008 One for the Fire: The Legacy of Night of the Living Dead, a documentary written by Gram, was released. It celebrates the 40th Anniversary of the definitive horror film of Independent American Cinema. The film is included on the 40th Anniversary edition of Night of the Living Dead released by Dimension Films. The film was also included on the European Blu-ray release of George Romero's Diary of the Dead, also from Dimension Films.

The film One for the Fire: The Legacy of Night of the Living Dead won a Rondo Hatton Classic Horror Award as best "Horror DVD" extra of the year 2008.

Charles Manson
For decades Gram publicly shared his beliefs that Charles Manson was convicted of crimes he did not commit, that he was not culpable in either the murders at Cielo Drive and that nor was he culpable in the murders on Waverly Drive, that Manson ordering brainwashed people to commit the murders was not true and that the prosecution's contention that inciting Helter Skelter was motive for the murders was a false and premeditated construct, tailored to aid in making Manson a patsy in order to cover the truth about what is really  going in L.A.  . 
Gram based a good part of his wrestling persona on the general public's perceptions of Manson.

In 2017 Gram was involved behind the scenes and in front of the camera for a soon to be released documentary called Manson's Bloodlines which chronicles the life and struggle of Manson's grandson, former MMA fighter Jason "Freebird" Freeman.

On March 17, 2018, Gram delivered a eulogy at Manson's funeral and acted as a pallbearer.  Subsequently, Gram has made several appearances on Brian Davis' TLB Radio podcasts describing Manson's funeral and his own beliefs concerning Manson, his friends and the infamous crimes linked to their names.

Accomplishment
Combat Zone Wrestling
 Best Mic Work (2007,2008,2009)
 Best Manager (2008,2009)
 Best Commentator (2008,2009)

References
Specific

General

External links

Wrestling Radio
Official CZW website
IWA MS website
CZW Profile

American male professional wrestlers
Combat Zone Wrestling
Living people
1970 births